1 Lincoln Plaza is a mixed-use, commercial and luxury residential condominium building in New York City with 43 floors and 671 units. Construction began in 1971. The building is in the heart of the Lincoln Center neighborhood. Completed and ready for occupancy in 1974, the building is divided into eight floors of commercial space and 36 floors of luxury residential apartments. The roof, which is often considered the 44th Floor is home to the building's private fitness club called Top of the One.

Usage
A five-story residential building at 33 West 63rd Street, a tenement constructed in the 1890s owned by Jehiel R. Elyachar, became the target of an effort by Paul Milstein to assemble a group of properties that would become the site of 1 Lincoln Plaza. After lengthy negotiations, Milstein and Elyachar had agreed to a deal in which Milstein would acquire the property for cash, and then agreed to an exchange for a building on the Upper East Side. Though a verbal agreement had been reached, Elyachar insisted that a donation of $100,000 be made to one of the charitable organizations he supported, at which point Milstein walked away and said "You know what, you're going to keep your building". Howard Milstein, Paul's son, called the negotiations as being "among the most glaring examples of someone who overplayed their hand". The surrounding buildings on the site were demolished and 1 Lincoln Plaza was constructed around Elyachar's building at 33 West 63rd Street. 

The building has multiple addresses other than "1 Lincoln Plaza", including 20 West 64th Street, 33 West 63rd Street, 1897 Broadway, and 1900 Broadway. Provided a unit number is included, any mail sent to any of the above addresses will reach the required tenant.

The building also has commercial tenants. These include three prominent entities in the entertainment industry: Sesame Workshop (which makes Sesame Street), SAG-AFTRA, and the prestigious American Society of Composers, Authors and Publishers (ASCAP); the headquarters of ASCAP have been at One Lincoln Plaza since 1974.

Notable residents
In January 2012, actor Nick Santino, a resident, committed suicide soon after euthanizing his pit bull Rocco, due to pressure from what some neighbors told the press was harassment by building management. The condominium board had enacted a ban on pit bulls in 2010, though Santino's dog had been allowed to remain through grandfathering.

In popular culture
The building can be seen in almost any scene that was filmed in the plaza at Lincoln Center after 1971, including Ghostbusters.

References

External links
 Ogden Cap Properties Website
 City Realty Article on One Lincoln Plaza

Residential skyscrapers in Manhattan
Residential condominiums in New York City
Residential buildings completed in 1974
Lincoln Square, Manhattan
Privately owned public spaces
Upper West Side